Opharus picturata is a moth of the family Erebidae. It was described by Hermann Burmeister in 1878. It is found in Uruguay, Argentina and Brazil.

References

Opharus
Moths described in 1878
Moths of South America